Artūrs Zjuzins (born 18 June 1991) is a Latvian football midfielder, currently playing for RFS and the Latvia national football team.

Club career
In his youth career Artūrs Zjuzins played for Jūrmala-VV, signing his first professional contract in 2007 with Ventspils. He played only 2 matches there, being sent to Tranzit in 2009. He played 17 matches there, scoring 1 goal. In 2010, he was taken back to Ventspils. Elected as the team's captain he played 20 matches that season, scoring 2 goals. In January 2011 it was reported that Zjuzins hadn't been let to join Lazio for €425'000. In March 2011 Zjuzins signed a contract with MŠK Žilina, playing in the Slovak Corgoň Liga. It was reported then, that the player had joined the club illegally, with no permission from Ventspils, but the situation was solved calmly and the player was let to join the Slovak side. He made his debut for Žilina against Košice on 15 March 2011, he also scored his first goal for the club then. Despite some good performances, he was released after the season. In August 2011 he was signed by the Russian National Football League team Baltika Kaliningrad as a free agent. During his first season in Kaliningrad Zjuzins scored 3 goals in 19 matches. The second season saw him score once in 25 games.

International career
Zjuzins has represented Latvia at both U-19 and U-21 levels. He received his first full international call-up for Latvia in 2012 for a friendly match against Kazakhstan on 29 February. Zjuzins scored his first international goal for Latvia in a 1–1 friendly match draw against Estonia on 14 August 2013. That was the debut match for Marians Pahars as the national team's manager. Zjuzins scored for the second match in a row on 6 September 2013, when Latvia beat Lithuania 2–1 in a 2014 FIFA World Cup qualifying match.

International goals
As of match played 6 June 2022. Latvia score listed first, score column indicates score after each Zjuzins goal.

Honours
Ventspils
 Latvian Higher League (2): 2007, 2008
 Latvian Cup (1): 2007

Latvia
 Baltic Cup (1): 2012

References

External links
 
 

1991 births
Living people
Footballers from Riga
Latvian footballers
Latvian expatriate footballers
Latvia youth international footballers
Latvia international footballers
Association football midfielders
FK Ventspils players
FC Tranzīts players
MŠK Žilina players
FC Baltika Kaliningrad players
FC Orenburg players
FC Tambov players
Riga FC players
FK RFS players
Latvian Higher League players
Slovak Super Liga players
Russian First League players
Expatriate footballers in Slovakia
Latvian expatriate sportspeople in Slovakia
Expatriate footballers in Russia
Latvian expatriate sportspeople in Russia